Motsau Joseph "Banks" Setlhodi (born 12 April 1947)  in Randfontein, South Africa is a retired South African association football player who played in South Africa for Randfontein Young Zebras and Kaizer Chiefs.

Early life
Setlhodi grew up in Madubaville, Randfontein. He attended Topia Lower Primary and later Wesele Higher Primary. He grew up playing soccer in the street until he was invited by his friend to play for Randfontein Young Zebras' 3rd Division side which he played for until he was promoted to the senior team. He joined Kaizer XI in 1969.

Club career
He was one of the first Kaizer Chiefs recruits, he was recruited by Ewert Nene. He could play all positions on the field and he was a regular penalty taker. He was nicknamed "Banks" after 1966 World Cup winner and former Hellenic goalkeeper Gordon Banks, when he saved a fierce penalty kick from the British XI's Rod Marsh.

International career
He represented South Africa in 1977 versus Rhodesia.

References 

1947 births
Living people
People from Randfontein
South African soccer players
South Africa international soccer players
Association football goalkeepers
Kaizer Chiefs F.C. players
South African soccer managers
Sportspeople from Gauteng